Foster Carr LaHue (2 September 1917 – 12 February 1996) was a lieutenant general in the United States Marine Corps. He saw combat in World War II, the Korean War and the Vietnam War. During the Vietnam War he commanded Task Force X-Ray which was involved in the heaviest fighting at the Battle of Huế.

Early life and education
LaHue graduated from Corydon High School and subsequently attended DePauw University where he graduated in 1939.

Career
LaHue completed Officer Candidates School at Marine Corps Base Quantico, Virginia, in May 1941 and was commissioned as a Marine Second lieutenant.

World War II
LaHue served as a platoon commander, company commander and battalion staff officer with the First and Fourth Raider Battalions, participating in the New Georgia Campaign and in the Admiralty Islands campaign in the Pacific Theatre.

Korean War
LaHue deployed to Korea in November 1950, serving as the Division Adjutant in the 1st Marine Division. From June to November 1951, he commanded the 3rd Battalion, 1st Marines, during this time he was awarded the Silver Star and the Legion of Merit.

Vietnam War
From March 1967 until April 1968, LaHue served with the 1st Marine Division in the Republic of Vietnam.

On 9 August 1967, the 1st Marine Division commander, MG Donn J. Robertson reactivated Task Force X-Ray with his Assistant Division Commander Brigadier general LaHue given command. Task Force X-Ray comprised the 1st Battalion, 5th Marines, 3rd Battalion, 5th Marines and the Battalion Landing Team 1st Battalion, 3rd Marines. BG LaHue then launched Operation Cochise against the People's Army of Vietnam (PAVN) 2nd Division in the Quế Sơn Valley. At the conclusion of the operation on 28 August 156 PAVN had been killed and 13 captured for the loss of 10 Marines.

On 4 December 1967 BG LaHue was again given command of Task Force X-Ray to implement Operation Checkers, the movement of the 1st Marine Division from Thừa Thiên Province north to Quảng Trị Province. On 11 January 1968 Task Force X-Ray headquarters was established at Phu Bai Combat Base and assumed operational control of the 5th Marine Regiment which moved north from Da Nang and the 1st Marine Regiment already based at Phu Bai.

In the early morning of 31 January 1968 as part of the Tet Offensive, the PAVN and Vietcong (VC) seized control of the city of Huế from the Army of the Republic of Vietnam (ARVN) 1st Division. The Marines at Phu Bai were called on to support the ARVN 1st Division and US forces at the Military Assistance Command Vietnam (MACV) compound in the new city on the south side of the river. LaHue would later write that "the initial deployment of forces was made with limited information." On 1 February BG LaHue ordered Colonel Gravel's 1st Battalion, 1st Marines to move 6 blocks west from the MACV Compound and recapture the Thừa Thiên provincial headquarters and prison. In a press interview he stated that "Very definitely, we control the south side of the city... I don't think they have any resupply capability, and once they've used up what they brought in, they're finished." As with other commanders LaHue still did not appreciate the strength of the PAVN/VC forces in the city or their open supply lines; the Marines would not capture the provincial headquarters and prison until 6 February. On 9 February once the new city of Huế had been largely secured by the Marines, BG LaHue ordered the 1/5 Marines to move into the Old City to support the ARVN in retaking the Citadel. In his briefing of 1/5 Marines commander Major Robert Thompson, LaHue expressed his view that it would only take a few days to clear the Citadel. On 16 February at a meeting with LaHue and deputy COMUSMACV General Creighton Abrams, South Vietnamese Prime Minister Nguyễn Cao Kỳ approved the use of all necessary force to clear the PAVN and VC forces from the Citadel. The following day the 1st Brigade, 101st Airborne Division was placed under the operational control of Task Force X-Ray and tasked with blocking PAVN/VC lines of retreat to the south and southwest of the city. Operation Hue City formally concluded on 2 March 1968 and BG LaHue redeployed his units in line with the original Operation Checkers plan and relinquished control of Army units temporarily assigned to his command.

On 14 March, BG LaHue launched Operation Ford on the Phu Thu Peninsula east of Phu Bai. The 2nd Battalion, 3rd Marines and the 1st Battalion, 1st Marines swept the area engaging the VC 804th Main Force Battalion. At the conclusion of the operation on 20 March 145 VC had been killed and 5 captured for the loss of 14 Marines.

On 7 April, BG LaHue was relieved as commander of Task Force X-Ray and returned to Da Nang, where he was replaced as assistant division commander of the 1st Marine Division on 14 April.

Later career
LaHue was promoted to major general in August 1969. He was promoted to lieutenant general on 1 August 1972, and served as chief of staff until his retirement on 1 September 1974

Decorations

Here is the ribbon bar of Lieutenant General Foster C. LaHue:

References

1918 births
1996 deaths
People from Corydon, Indiana
DePauw University alumni
George Washington University alumni
Marine Raiders
United States Marine Corps generals
United States Marine Corps personnel of World War II
United States Marine Corps personnel of the Korean War
United States Marine Corps personnel of the Vietnam War
Recipients of the Navy Distinguished Service Medal
Recipients of the Legion of Merit
Recipients of the Silver Star
Recipients of the Air Medal
Recipients of the National Order of Vietnam
Recipients of the Gallantry Cross (Vietnam)
Recipients of the Distinguished Service Order (Vietnam)
Burials at Arlington National Cemetery